Bernard Sévigny (born December 18, 1961) is a Canadian politician, who was mayor of Sherbrooke, Quebec from 2009 to 2017.

Education
Sévigny has a Bachelor of Arts in Political Science and French from the University of Alberta. He has a certificate in information and journalism from the Université de Montréal. He also holds a Bachelor's degree in Economics, as well as a Master's degree in the management and development of co-operatives, and a doctor of business administration from the Université de Sherbrooke.

Career
Sévigny was a journalist at TVA from 1989 to 1999. He was a professor in the faculty of administration at the Université de Sherbrooke from 2007 to 2009.

Political career
Sévigny was elected as a city councillor to Sherbrooke City Council in the 2001 Sherbrooke municipal election. He was re-elected in the 2005 municipal election and served until the 2009 municipal election.

He was elected mayor of Sherbrooke on November 12, 2009, following the 2009 municipal election. Sévigny won by just 122 votes over challenger Hélène Gravel on election day. Gravel requested a recount, but was denied by a court ruling.

References

1961 births
French Quebecers
Living people
Mayors of Sherbrooke
Politicians from Montreal
University of Alberta alumni
Université de Montréal alumni
Université de Sherbrooke alumni